Masjid Shah can refer to:

 Shah Mosque in Isfahan, Iran
 Sultan Idris Shah State Mosque in Perak, Malaysia